The notion of a sovereign state arises in the mid-16th century with the development of modern diplomacy.
For earlier times, the term "sovereign state" is an anachronism. What corresponded to sovereign states in the medieval and ancient period were monarchs ruling By the Grace of God, de facto feudal or imperial autocrats, or de facto independent nations or tribal confederations.

Sovereign states

A 
  Adal – Adal Sultanate
  – Kingdom of Alodia
  Andorra – Principality of Andorra
  Aq Qoyunlu – Aq Qoyunlu Federation
  – Sultanate of Arakan
 
  – Kingdom of Assam
  Astrakhan – Khanate of Astrakhan
  Ayutthaya – Ayutthaya Kingdom
  Aztec Empire – Aztec Empire

B 
  Béarn – Viscountcy of Béarn
  – Sultanate of Bengal
  Benin – Benin Empire
  – Kingdom of Bhadgaon
  Bosnian Kingdom

C 
 Ceylon – Kotte Kingdom
  – Cherokee Tribe
  – Empire of the Great Ming
  – Kingdom of Connaught
 Cospaia – Republic of Cospaia
  – Creek Tribe
 Crimea – Crimean Khanate

D 
  – Sultanate of Deccan
  – Sultanate of Delhi

E 
  – Kingdom of England
  – Empire of Ethiopia

F 
  Ferrara – Ferrara
  – Kingdom of Fez
  Florence – Republic of Florence
  – Kingdom of France
  – Funj Tribe

G 
  – Republic of Genoa
  – Kingdom of Gondwana
  – Golden Horde
  – Sultanate of Gujarat

H 
  – Haasa Tribe
  Ifriqiya – Ruled by the Hafsid dynasty
  – Hawsa Tribe
  – Sultanate of Hedjaz
  Hungary – Kingdom of Hungary
  – Huron Tribe

I 
  – Kingdom of Imereti, with autonomous vassals:
  Guria – Principality of Guria
  – Principality of Mingrelia, with vassal:
  Abkhazia – Principality of Abkhazia
  – Principality of Svaneti
  – Inca Empire
  – Iroquois, the Nations

J 
  Japan – divided into small warring states
  – Jolof Empire, with vassal:
 Waalo – Kingdom of Waalo

K 
  – Kingdom of Kaffa
  – Kingdom of Kakheti
  – Kalmar Union, consisting of
  – Kingdom of Denmark
  Norway – Kingdom of Norway
  Sweden – Kingdom of Sweden
  – Empire of Kanem Bornu
  – Kingdom of Kartli
  – Sultanate of Kashmir
  – Kingdom of Kathmandu
  – Kazakh Khanate
  Kazan – Khanate of Kazan
  – Sultanate of Khandesh
  Knights of St. John – Knights of St. John
  Kongo – Kingdom of Kongo
  Korea – Kingdom of Joseon
  – Kotoko Kingdom

L 
  Lithuania – Grand Duchy of Lithuania
  Lucca – Republic of Lucca

M 
  – Majapahit Empire
  – Sultanate of Malacca
  Maldives – Sultanate of Maldives
  – Mali Empire
  – Sultanate of Malwa
  Mamluk Sultanate – Mamluk Sultanate of Egypt
  – Kingdom of Mandara
  – Kingdom of Manipur
  – Maya Empire
  Modena – Duchy of Modena
  Moldavia – Principality of Moldavia
  – Mong Mao
  – Sultanate of Morocco
  – Kingdom of Mrauk U
  – Khanate of Mughalistan
  – Kingdom of Munster
  – Kingdom of Mutapa
  Muscovy – Grand Duchy of Moscow
  Mysore – Kingdom of Mysore
  – Kingdom of Wakaner

N 
  – Kingdom of Najd
  Naples – Kingdom of Naples
  Navarre – Kingdom of Navarre
  – Kingdom of Nepal

O 
  – Sultanate of Oman
  – Kingdom of Orissa
  – Ottoman Empire, with vassals:
  Crimea – Crimean Khanate
  Wallachia – Principality of Wallachia
  – Oyo Empire

P 
  Papal States – States of the Church
  – Kingdom of Patan
  – Kingdom of Pegu
  Poland – Kingdom of Poland
  Portugal – Kingdom of Portugal
  Pskov – Pskov Feudal Republic

Q 
  – Federation of Qara Koyunlu
  Qasim – Qasim Khanate

R 
  Ragusa – Republic of Ragusa
  – Kingdom of Rajputna
  Ryazan – Principality of Ryazan
  Ryūkyū – Ryūkyū Kingdom

S 
 Saaremaa – Bishopric of Saaremaa-Wiek
  Saluzzo – Marquisate of Saluzzo
  – Principality of Samtskhe
  – Most Serene Republic of San Marino
 County of Santa Fiora
  – Duchy of Savoy
  – Kingdom of Scotland
  – Kingdom of Shan
  – Tribe of Shawnee
  – Khanate of Sibir
  Siena – Republic of Siena
  – Sultanate of Sind
  – Songhai Empire
  Spain – Spain, a loose union between:
  Aragon – Crown of Aragon, consisting of:
  Aragon – Kingdom of Aragon
  Catalonia – Principality of Catalonia
  Majorca – Kingdom of Majorca
  Sicily – Kingdom of Sicily
  Valencia – Kingdom of Valencia
  Castile and León – Crown of Castile, consisting of:
  Castile – Kingdom of Castile
  León – Kingdom of León
 – Kingdom of Sukhothai
  – Sulu Sultanate
  – Swahili Tribe

T 
 Tartu – Bishopric of Tartu
  – Kingdom of Taungu
  Teutonic Knights – Monastic State of the Teutonic Knights
  – Kingdom of Texcoco
  – Tibet
 Timurid Empire
  Kingdom of Tlemcen – Kingdom of Tlemcen
  – Kingdom of Travancore
  – Kingdom of Tripoli

U 
  – Earldom of Ulster

V 
  – Most Serene Republic of Venice
  – Vijayanagara Empire

W 
  – Principality of Wallachia
  – Wattasid Sultanate

Y 
  – Kingdom of Yemen

Z 
  – Zapotec tribe
  Zeta – Principality of Zeta

Notes 

1494